Daniel Motlop (born 16 March 1982) is an Indigenous Larrakia Australian rules footballer who played a total of 130 senior games for the North Melbourne Football Club and the Port Adelaide Football Club in the Australian Football League (AFL). His post-AFL career has included stints with the Wanderers Football Club in the Northern Territory Football League.

He is general manager and part-owner of a native foods business called Something Wild, located in the Barossa Valley, South Australia.

AFL career

Kangaroos career (2001–2005) 
Playing as a defender or forward, Motlop debuted in 2001 for the Kangaroos and was traded to Port Adelaide at the end of 2005 due to a desire to return to South Australia.

Port Adelaide career (2006–2011) 
In late 2005 Motlop was traded to Port Adelaide. In the 2007 season, Motlop suffered from an ankle injury in Round 1 and a broken collarbone in Round 9. However, he came back in Round 13 against Brisbane and kicked a career best 6 goals to help set up Port's win, including a goal of the year nomination.

In the 2008 AFL season he ranked 10th on the list of most goals kicked in the AFL, including a career best 7 goal game against  Essendon and a 5-goal game against Fremantle, including a candidate for goal of the year.

The 2009 season saw Motlop average 2 goals a game in the 11 games he played, but he missed most of the second half of the season with a fractured ankle. Surgery to his ankle prevented him from returning to the Power side until Round 7, 2010, where he kicked 3.1 goals. He was delisted by the Power at the end of the 2011 season, marking an end to his 83 games and 155 goals with the club.

Family
Daniel is one of a number of family members to have played in the AFL. He is the younger brother of North Melbourne and Melbourne player Shannon, the older brother of Port Adelaide player Steven, and the cousin of fellow Port Adelaide player Marlon. 

 Daniel's son Jesse plays for the Carlton Football Club.

Native foods
In 2016 Motlop became general manager and part-owner of a native foods business, Something Wild, located in the Barossa Valley. His cousin Marlon is also involved in the business.

References

External links

Wanderers Football Club official website

Port Adelaide Football Club players
Port Adelaide Football Club players (all competitions)
North Melbourne Football Club players
North Adelaide Football Club players
1982 births
Living people
Wanderers Football Club players
Indigenous Australian players of Australian rules football
Australian rules footballers from the Northern Territory
Australia international rules football team players
Port Melbourne Football Club players
Sportspeople from Darwin, Northern Territory
21st-century Australian businesspeople